Liolaemus calchaqui is a species of lizard in the family  Liolaemidae. It is native to Argentina.

References

calchaqui
Reptiles described in 1996
Reptiles of Argentina
Taxa named by Fernando Lobo